Homestead–Miami Speedway is a motor racing track located in Homestead, Florida. The track, which has several configurations, has promoted several series of racing, including NASCAR, the IndyCar Series, the WeatherTech SportsCar Championship series, and the Championship Cup Series.

From 2002 to 2019, Homestead–Miami Speedway had hosted the final race of the season in all three of NASCAR's series as Ford Championship Weekend: the NASCAR Cup Series, NASCAR Xfinity Series, and the NASCAR Camping World Truck Series. The races currently have the names Dixie Vodka 400, Contender Boats 250, and Baptist Health 200, respectively.

History

The speedway was constructed, with the efforts of promoter Ralph Sanchez, as part of a plan to help Homestead rebound after the devastation caused by Hurricane Andrew. Groundbreaking began August 24, 1993, exactly one year after the hurricane.

It opened in November 1995 with a NASCAR Busch Series race, the last race of that season. The Busch Series would continue to hold its season-ending races at Homestead; in 2002 NASCAR's Winston Cup Series and Craftsman Truck Series would also hold their season-ending races at Homestead as well. From 2002 to 2019, NASCAR  marketed the season-ending Homestead races as Ford Championship Weekend.

In the spring of 1996, the CART series held its first race there.

The track reflects the art deco district of nearby Miami Beach with its liberal use of colors such as aqua, purple and silver. Though the track itself has been considered to be aesthetically pleasing from the outset, initially the racing at Homestead was not considered very good. The track opened as a four-turn, rectangular-oval, based on the Indianapolis Motor Speedway's layout, coincidental considering that circuit and  Miami Beach were developed by Carl G. Fisher. However, due to its shorter distance, the track was not able to maintain the racing characteristics of the Indianapolis Motor Speedway. Instead, the sharp, flat turns and aprons made passing difficult and lowered overall speed. The geometry also created unfavorably severe crash angles. The movie Super Speedway was shot at the speedway before the track was reconfigured to an oval. In the summer of 1997, an $8.2 million reconfiguration project changed the turns from a rectangle to a traditional, continuous turn oval.

In 2003, the track was reconfigured once again. The turns were changed from mostly flat to steep variable banking. In 2005, lights were installed to allow night racing for the first time. The renovations were praised by fans, and the track has produced a number of close finishes, including 2005's last-lap battle between Greg Biffle and Mark Martin.

Other drivers to suffer fatal injuries at the speedway are John Nemechek in a Craftsman Truck race on March 16, 1997, and Jeff Clinton who died in a Grand Am sports car event at the track in March 2002.

In 2009, Homestead became the home to a total of five season-ending racing series events, with the GAINSCO Auto Insurance Indy 300 finale for the IRL IndyCar Series as well as the Grand-Am Rolex Sports Car Series moving to October from their traditional early season slots. The IndyCar Series would discontinue its Homestead race while the Rolex Series later changed its Homestead race to a date earlier in the season.

Behind the main grandstand is the Homestead RC Raceway for radio controlled cars, it was used to host the 2011 IFMAR Worlds for 1:8 IC Track cars.

Track length of paved oval
This length was referenced to the old rectangular layout. In 1998 was the track length remeasured to  This length was also used for timing and scoring until the last CART race in 2000. This length was referenced to the flat paperclip-layout. This length was used by IRL between 2001 and 2003, too. This length referenced to the new banked layout.

Track configurations
All maps use dashed gray lines for the other courses. Solid gray lines represent other pit road options for the shown course.

Lap records
As of June 2021, the fastest official race lap records at Homestead-Miami Speedway are listed as:

Racing events

Current races
NASCAR Cup Series
Dixie Vodka 400 (1999–present)
NASCAR Xfinity Series
Contender Boats 300 (1995–present)
NASCAR Camping World Truck Series
Baptist Health 200 (1996–2020, 2022)

Former races
AMA Superbike Championship (1996, 2012)
Atlantic Championship
Marlboro Grand Prix of Miami (1996, 1997, 2000)
CART
Marlboro Grand Prix of Miami (1996–2000)
Cooper Tires U.S. F2000 National Championship powered by Mazda
Winterfest (2011)
FIA GT Championship
Homestead 3 Hour (1998–1999)
Florida Winter Series (2014)
Formula 4 United States Championship (2016–2017, 2020)
Formula Regional Americas Championship (2020)
Formula Renault North America (2003)
Grand Am Rolex Sports Car Series
Grand Prix of Miami (2000–2012)
IMSA Continental Tire Sports Car Challenge
Kia 200 (2003–2004, 2007, 2009–2012)
Indy Lights
Fuzzy's Ultra Premium Vodka 100 (1996–1999, 2003–2010)
NASCAR Camping World Truck Series
SuperTruck 25 (1995)
NASCAR Goody's Dash Series (1995–1998)
LATAM Challenge Series (2014)
NASCAR AutoZone Elite Division, Southeast Series (1995–1998, 2000)
USAC Silver Crown Series (2006–2007)
United States Road Racing Championship
Sports Car Extravaganza (1998–1999)
IndyCar Series
Cafés do Brasil Indy 300 (2001–2010)
Trans-Am Series (1996, 1998, 2014–2018)

Records

IndyCar

NASCAR

NASCAR statistics

* from minimum 4 starts.
(As of 11/18/12)

Note

References

External links

Homestead–Miami Speedway – official website

High Resolution image from Google Maps

Champ Car circuits
Sports venues completed in 1995
Homestead, Florida
IndyCar Series tracks
Motorsport venues in Florida
NASCAR races at Homestead-Miami Speedway
NASCAR tracks
Sports venues in Miami
1995 establishments in Florida
Road courses in the United States